Thomas Cathern, Gadarn or Gatharne (by 1519 – 1565 or later), of Prendergast, Pembrokeshire, was a Welsh politician.

He was a Member (MP) of the Parliament of England for Pembrokeshire in 1558.

References

Year of death missing
16th-century Welsh politicians
People from Pembrokeshire
Members of the Parliament of England (pre-1707) for constituencies in Wales
English MPs 1558
Year of birth uncertain